Emily Pitkin (Perkins) Baldwin, (January 1, 1796 – January 29, 1874), was born in Hartford, Connecticut, to Enoch Perkins and Hannah Pitkin. On October 25, 1820 she married Roger Sherman Baldwin, who became the Governor of Connecticut in 1844 and US Senator in 1847. Emily and Roger had nine children.

Children 
 Edward Law Baldwin (1 October 1822 – 6 July 1848)
 Elizabeth Wooster Baldwin (8 August 1824 – 10 September 1912)
 Roger Sherman Baldwin (4 July 1826 – 12 November 1856)
 Ebenezer Simeon Baldwin (4 March 1828 – 28 April 1836)
 Henrietta Perkins Baldwin (3 April 1830 – 15 January 1910)
 George William Baldwin (24 April 1832 – 30 January 1930)
 Emily Frances Baldwin (13 December 1834 – 27 April 1836)
 Ebenezer Charles Baldwin (17 September 1837 – 10 December 1937)
 Simeon Eben Baldwin (5 February 1840 – 30 January 1927)

Ancestry 
Emily was also an aunt to Charlotte Perkins Gilman, Frederic Beecher Perkins and US Representative Timothy Pitkin; an aunt-by-marriage to author Edward Everett Hale, the mother of Connecticut Governor and Chief Justice Simeon Eben Baldwin; daughter-in-law to US Representative and Judge Simeon Baldwin; mother-in-law to Massachusetts Chief Justice Dwight Foster; grandmother of New York Supreme Court Justice Edward Baldwin Whitney and attorneys Roger Sherman Baldwin Foster and Reginald Foster; the granddaughter of the Rev. Timothy Pitkin (Yale 1747), great-granddaughter Governor William Pitkin and the Reverend Thomas Clap, who was the fifth President of Yale College; a descendant of Governors George Wyllys and John Haynes of Connecticut and Governor Thomas Dudley of the Massachusetts Bay Colony; and the Governor William Bradford of the Plymouth Colony.

In 1786 her father, Enoch Perkins, began what has become the oldest law firm in continuous practice in the United States, now known as Howard, Kohn, Sprague & FitzGerald; and his original law practice shingle is one of the firm's most prized heirlooms. In 1820 her brother, Thomas Clap Perkins, joined their father's law practice. Thomas Perkins married Mary Foote Beecher, daughter of Lyman Beecher and the sister of author Harriet Beecher Stowe. In 1855 Thomas Perkins's son Charles expanded the firm's litigation practice and became widely recognized as one of the State Capital's finest trial lawyers.

Charles Perkins also became a close friend and legal counselor to Samuel Clemens, known to most by his pen name Mark Twain. In 1889 Charles Perkins' son Arthur continued the Perkins family stewardship of the firm until his death in 1932. Arthur Perkins also was a founding member of the Appalachian Trail Association and became known as the "Father of the Appalachian Trail," which spans from Georgia to Maine.

References 
 familysearch.org Accessed September 4, 2007
 Roger Sherman Baldwin - Connecticut State Library Accessed September 4, 2007
 Simeon Eben Baldwin - Connecticut State Library Accessed September 4, 2007
 Sherman Genealogy Including Families of Essex, Suffolk and Norfolk, England By Thomas Townsend Sherman
 George William Baldwin - Roster and Genealogies of the 15th Massachusetts Volunteer Infantry

External links 
Thomas Clapp Perkins - Connecticut State Library
Research Guide to Connecticut's "Western Lands" or "Western Reserve"
Howard, Kohn, Sprague & FitzGerald Firm History

1796 births
1863 deaths
First Ladies and Gentlemen of Connecticut